Asphondylia is a cosmopolitan genus of gall midges in the family Cecidomyiidae. All species in this genus induce galls on plants, especially on flowers and flower buds. There are over 300 described species in Asphondylia, with many more likely to be discovered and described, especially in the southern hemisphere.

Within the genus, characteristics of the larvae and pupae are often most useful for distinguishing between species since adults of most species look very similar to one another. The species inducing a given gall can sometimes be identified based on the shape and placement of the gall in combination with the identity of the host plant.

Species

References

Further reading

External links

 

Cecidomyiinae
Cecidomyiidae genera
Gall-inducing insects

Taxa named by Hermann Loew
Insects described in 1850